Markham Museum (in the past known as The Markham District Historical Museum and later Markham Museum & Historic Village) is a  open-air museum located in Markham, Ontario, Canada. It is dedicated to the preservation of old buildings and artefacts from Markham's past, especially as the original rural village has become an urban centre.

Overview
The site features nearly 30 buildings: houses, barns, sheds, a train station, a school, a general store, a church, a blacksmith, a harness shop, a saw mill, a cider mill, and many more. One of the oldest buildings is the Hoover House, built in 1824 by a Mennonite family that was originally from Pennsylvania.

The site has been open since 1971, using the former Mount Joy School (1907) as its main offices and archives. The museum is located at 9350 Highway 48 (Markham Road / York Regional Road 68), on the northwest corner of 16th Avenue (York Regional Road 73).

All of the historic buildings were moved to the site from other places around Markham, with the exception of the Mount Joy School. The name Mount Joy has also been preserved in the name of the nearby Mount Joy GO Transit train and bus station, as well as the Mount Joy Community Centre to the east.

Markham Museum is open year-round to visitors, event rentals and researchers. An Ontario Historical Plaque was erected in front of the Markham Museum by the province to commemorate the founding of Markham's role in Ontario's heritage.

References

Notes

Sources

External links

 Official website

Buildings and structures in Markham, Ontario
Open-air museums in Canada
Local museums in Ontario
Archives in Ontario
Museums in the Regional Municipality of York
Tourist attractions in Markham, Ontario
Museums established in 1971
1971 establishments in Ontario